Maurizio Damilano (born 6 April 1957 in Scarnafigi, Italy) is an Italian former race walker. He won 15 individual medals (22 also with team events), at senior level, at the International athletics competitions.

Biography
He was the 1980 Olympic Champion and the 1987 and 1991 World Champion in the 20 km race walk. He has 60 caps in national team from 1977 to 1992.

Damilano is also the world record holder of the 30 km race walk with the time of 2:01:44.1, achieved in Cuneo in 1992. He is the twin brother of the former race walker Giorgio Damilano and of the coach Sandro Damilano.

In 1999, Maurizio Damilano and Giorgio Damilano founded Fit Walking.

Achievements

National titles
Maurizio Damilano has won the individual national championship 21 times.
6 wins in the 10,000 m walk (1979, 1981, 1982, 1983, 1984, 1985)
1 win in the 15 km walk (1987)
10 wins in the 20 km walk (1978, 1980, 1981, 1982, 1983, 1984, 1985, 1986, 1988, 1992)
3 wins in the 50 km walk (1985, 1986, 1989)
1 win in the 3000 metres walk indoor (1984)

See also
 Walk of Fame of Italian sport
 Italy national athletics team – Multiple medalists
 Italy national athletics team - More caps
 Italian Athletics Championships - Multi winners
 FIDAL Hall of Fame
 Italian all-time lists - 20 km walk
 Italian all-time lists - 50 km walk
 Italy at the World Athletics Race Walking Team Championships
 Fit Walking
 Saluzzo Race Walking School

References

External links

 
 Maurizio Damilano at All-Athletics
 Euro Legends feature article from European Athletics

1957 births
Living people
Sportspeople from the Province of Cuneo
Italian male racewalkers
Italian athletics coaches
Olympic athletes of Italy
Olympic gold medalists for Italy
Olympic bronze medalists for Italy
Athletes (track and field) at the 1980 Summer Olympics
Athletes (track and field) at the 1984 Summer Olympics
Athletes (track and field) at the 1988 Summer Olympics
Athletes (track and field) at the 1992 Summer Olympics
World Athletics Championships athletes for Italy
World Athletics Championships medalists
European Athletics Championships medalists
Medalists at the 1988 Summer Olympics
Medalists at the 1984 Summer Olympics
Medalists at the 1980 Summer Olympics
Olympic gold medalists in athletics (track and field)
Olympic bronze medalists in athletics (track and field)
Mediterranean Games gold medalists for Italy
Athletes (track and field) at the 1983 Mediterranean Games
Athletes (track and field) at the 1987 Mediterranean Games
Athletes (track and field) at the 1991 Mediterranean Games
World Athletics record holders
Universiade medalists in athletics (track and field)
Athletics competitors of Gruppo Sportivo Esercito
Mediterranean Games medalists in athletics
Universiade gold medalists for Italy
Universiade silver medalists for Italy
World Athletics Indoor Championships medalists
World Athletics Championships winners
Medalists at the 1981 Summer Universiade
Medalists at the 1983 Summer Universiade
Italian Athletics Championships winners